Claude Thomas Bissell  (February 10, 1916 – June 21, 2000) was a Canadian author and educator.

Biography
He was the eighth president of the University of Toronto from 1958 to 1971. He played a major part in the expansion of the University of Toronto, tripling the size of the university during his tenure.

He was born in Meaford, Ontario, the youngest of nine children. He graduated from the University of Toronto with a Bachelor of Arts degree in 1936 and received his Master of Arts degree in English literature in 1937. He earned his PhD in English Literature from Cornell University where he won the Luana L. Messenger Prize for Graduate Research in 1940. He served in the Canadian Army during World War II.

In 1952 he was made assistant professor at the University of Toronto. From 1956 to 1958 he was president of Carleton College (now Carleton University) returning to the University of Toronto in 1958 to become president.

He was the chair of the Canada Council from 1960 to 1962.

The Claude T. Bissell Building at the University of Toronto, which houses the Faculty of Information, is named after him.

He married Christine and they had one daughter, Deirdre MacDonald.

Because of his education, he was an officer in World War II, attaining the rank of captain in the Argyll and Sutherland Highlanders of Canada and worked in the intelligence section.

Honours
In 1957, he was elected a fellow of the Royal Society of Canada.
In 1969 he was made a Companion of the Order of Canada.
In 1976 he received an honorary Doctor of Letters from University of Leeds.

Quotes

"The Social Sciences are good at accounting for disasters once they have taken place."
Referring to the Argyll and Sutherland Highlanders of Canada, his regiment in World War II, "a happy regiment and a formidable one in action."
"Risk more than others think is safe. Care more than others think is wise. Dream more than others think is practical. Expect more than others think is possible."

Selected bibliography
 University College: A Portrait - 1953
 Halfway Up Parnassus: A Personal Account of the University of Toronto 1932-71 - 1974
 A Brief Biography: Vincent Massey, 1887-1967 - 1981
 The Imperial Canadian: Vincent Massey in Office -1986
 Ernest Buckler Remembered - 1989

References

External links
 
Claude Bissell archival papers held at the University of Toronto Archives and Record Management Services

1916 births
2000 deaths
Canadian male non-fiction writers
Canadian literary critics
Companions of the Order of Canada
Fellows of the Royal Society of Canada
Members of the United Church of Canada
Writers from Ontario
People from Grey County
Presidents of the University of Toronto
Canadian Army personnel of World War II
University of Toronto alumni
Presidents of Carleton University
20th-century Canadian historians
Cornell University alumni
Fellows of the Australian Academy of the Humanities
Argyll and Sutherland Highlanders of Canada (Princess Louise's)
Argyll and Sutherland Highlanders of Canada (Princess Louise's) officers